Weslyn Melva Mather (née Dunford; October 2, 1945 – November 22, 2015) was a provincial politician in the Canadian province of Alberta. She served as a member in the Legislative Assembly of Alberta from 2004 to 2008 sitting with the Liberal caucus in opposition.

Early life
Weslyn Mather was born in 1945. She married her husband Dick Mather in 1965. She worked as a psychologist and school administrator. In 1972 she sustained injuries in a car accident that left her in a wheelchair.

Political career
Mather ran for a seat to the Alberta Legislature in the 2004 election as the Liberal candidate in the electoral district of Edmonton-Mill Woods. She won the election defeating Progressive Conservative candidate Naresh Bhardwaj in a hotly contested race.

Mather ran for a second term in office in the 2008 Alberta general election but was defeated by Progressive Conservative candidate Carl Benito. On November 22, 2015, she died at the age of 70 after an infection.

References

External links
Legislative Assembly of Alberta Members Listing

1945 births
Alberta Liberal Party MLAs
2015 deaths
People from Lethbridge
Politicians from Edmonton
Women MLAs in Alberta
21st-century Canadian politicians
21st-century Canadian women politicians